Harcourt is a surname, and may refer to:

Alfred Harcourt (1881–1954), American publisher
Alison Harcourt, Australian mathematician
Augustus George Vernon Harcourt (1834–1919), English chemist 
Bernard Harcourt, American researcher on crime and punishment
Cecil Harcourt (1892–1959), British naval commander
Cecil Harcourt Smith (1859–1944), British archaeologist and museum director
Charles Harcourt (1838–1880), British actor
Charlie Harcourt, songwriter and guitarist, particularly active in the 1970s; associated with Jackson Heights, Cat Mother & the All Night Newsboys and Lindisfarne. 
Ed Harcourt (born 1977), English singer-songwriter
Edward Venables-Vernon-Harcourt (1757–1847), English clergyman
Edward William Vernon Harcourt (1825–1891), English naturalist
Geoffrey Harcourt (1931–2021), Australian economist
George Harcourt (1785–1861), British politician
Georgiana Harcourt (1807–1886), British translator
Henry Harcourt (1873–1933), British politician
Henry Harcourt (Jesuit) (1612–1673), English Jesuit
James Harcourt (1873–1951), British actor
Lewis Harcourt, 1st Viscount Harcourt (1863–1922), British politician, Secretary of State for the Colonies
Mike Harcourt (born 1943), Canadian politician in British Columbia
Nic Harcourt (born 1957), American radio station music director
Octavius Vernon Harcourt (1793–1863), British naval officer 
Philip de Harcourt, 12th-century Lord Chancellor of England
Richard Harcourt (1849–1932), Canadian judge and politician in Ontario
Robert Harcourt (explorer) (1575–1631), British explorer of Guiana
Robert Harcourt (1902–1969), Northern Irish politician
Robert Harcourt (Liberal politician) (1878 – 1962), British diplomat, playwright, and MP
Simon Harcourt, 1st Viscount Harcourt (1661–1727), Lord Chancellor of Great Britain
Simon Harcourt, 1st Earl Harcourt (1714–1777), British diplomatist and general
Thomas Harcourt, better known as Thomas Whitbread, (1618–1679), English Jesuit
William Harcourt, 3rd Earl Harcourt (1743–1830), English nobleman and soldier
William Harcourt (martyr) (1609–1679), English martyr
William Vernon Harcourt (scientist) (1789–1871), founder of the British Association for the Advancement of Science
William Harcourt (politician) (1827–1904), British Liberal statesman

See also
Vernon-Harcourt, surname
House of Harcourt

Surnames of Norman origin